Billy Michael Burrage (born June 9, 1950), known as Michael Burrage, is an attorney and former United States district judge of all three districts of the United States district courts for Oklahoma: the Eastern, Western and Northern. He was appointed and confirmed in 1994 under President Bill Clinton. In 1996, he became Chief Judge of the Eastern District of Oklahoma, and served all three courts until his retirement in 2001. At that time, he returned to private practice, during which he also represented the Choctaw Nation as its general counsel and ambassador to the U.S. government.

Education and career

Burrage was born into a Choctaw family in Durant, Oklahoma, and became an enrolled member of the tribe. After attending local schools, he went to college at Southeastern Oklahoma State University, where he received a Bachelor of Science degree in 1971. He earned a Juris Doctor from University of Oklahoma College of Law in 1974. He is known as Michael Burrage in his professional life.

He went into private practice at the Stamper and Burrage law firm in Antlers, Oklahoma that year, working with them for two decades until 1994. That year he was appointed as a federal district judge for the district courts of Oklahoma. After retiring as federal judge in 2001, he returned to private practice.

Federal judicial service

Burrage served as a United States district judge for all three of the United States district courts in Oklahoma—Western, Northern, and Eastern. He was nominated by President Bill Clinton on March 9, 1994, to the seat vacated by H. Dale Cook. He was confirmed by the United States Senate on June 8, 1994, and received his commission on June 9, 1994. 

In 1996 Burrage became the Chief Judge of the Eastern District of Oklahoma, serving until his resignation from the court in 2001. He continued to serve the other two district courts as well.

Post judicial career

Between 1999 and 2002, Burrage, his brothers Steve and David, and Steve's wife Roberta, became the sole owners of FirstBank of Oklahoma. In 2001, Burrage resigned his judicial duties in all three Oklahoma districts, and returned to private law practice. He started Burrage Law Firm PLLC with his younger son David and daughter-in-law Heather (née Hillburn) Burrage. 

In 2008, Burrage became a Managing Partner in a second law firm, which was refounded as the Whitten Burrage Law Firm. His practice included representing the Choctaw Nation of Oklahoma as general counsel, with his job taking on the makings of an ambassador.

Family

Burrage's brother Steve is a former Oklahoma State Auditor and Inspector. Burrage's older son Sean was elected and served as a member of the Oklahoma Senate. He now serves as the President of Southeastern Oklahoma State University in Durant, Oklahoma.

Notes

See also
List of first minority male lawyers and judges in the United States
List of Native American jurists

References
 

1950 births
Living people
20th-century American judges
21st-century American judges
20th-century American lawyers
21st-century American lawyers
20th-century Native Americans
21st-century Native Americans
Choctaw Nation of Oklahoma people
Judges of the United States District Court for the Western District of Oklahoma
Judges of the United States District Court for the Northern District of Oklahoma
Judges of the United States District Court for the Eastern District of Oklahoma
Native American judges
Native American lawyers
People from Durant, Oklahoma
People from Antlers, Oklahoma
United States district court judges appointed by Bill Clinton